Thorleif Svendsen (7 June 1910 – 21 September 1975) was a Norwegian footballer. He played in three matches for the Norway national football team in 1934.

References

External links
 

1910 births
1975 deaths
Norwegian footballers
Norway international footballers
Place of birth missing
Association footballers not categorized by position